CCNI may refer to:
Computational Center for Nanotechnology Innovations, supercomputing centre at the Rensselaer Polytechnic Institute, USA
Charity Commission for Northern Ireland, government body regulating charities in Northern Ireland
CCNI (gene), also known as Cyclin 1
 CCNI S.A., Compañía Chilena de Navegación Interoceánica S.A. (Chilean Interoceanic navigation company)
Comité consultatif national de l'immunisation (CCNI), French name of the National Advisory Committee on Immunization (NACI) of Canada